The 12th Army was a field army of the Red Army during the Russian Civil War, which was formed twice.

First formation

The 12th Army was formed on October 3, 1918 in the region of Astrakhan and the Eastern part of the Northern Caucasus. It was part of the Southern Front since November 3, 1918 and then of the Caspian-Caucasian Front, with which it fought the Northern Caucasus Operation (1918–1919), between December 8, 1918 and March 13, 1919 when it was disbanded.
It was composed of the 45th and 58th divisions.

Second formation
On June 16, 1919, a new 12th Army was formed from the troops of the 1st and 3rd Ukrainian Soviet Army. It fought in Ukraine against Anton Denikin's Volunteer Army, and then against the troops of Symon Petliura, which it pushed back behind the Zbrucz River. Here it first encountered troops of the Polish Army. 
It 1919, it was composed of the 44th, 47th, 58th and 60th divisions, as well as of the 9th Cavalry division. The advances of the Ukrainians and of The Volunteer Army forced the 12th Army Northward. On August 31st, The 12th army was forced to retreat from Kiev without much combat occurring. On December 10th, it fought in the 6-day long 4th Battle of Kiev to retake the city from the White Army. 

In the spring of 1920, as part of the Southwestern Front, the 12th Army was deployed against the Polish offensive in Ukraine and was pushed back over the Dnieper. In the counteroffensive of the Red Army in summer 1920, it reached the Bug River. At the end of the Polish-Soviet War, the 12th Army had suffered heavy losses and was disbanded on December 25, 1920.
It 1920, it was composed of the 7th, 44th, 47th, 58th divisions and 17th Cavalry division.

Commanders

First formation 

 Alexei Ivanovich Avtonomov (3 October - 15 November 1918), appointed but never took command,
 V.L. Stepanov (3 October 1918 - 14 February 1919),
 Nikolai Zhdanov (14 February - 13 March 1919).

Second formation 

 Nikolai Semyonov (16 June — 8 September 1919),
 Sergei Mezheninov (10 September 1919 — 10 June 1920),
 Gaspar Voskanyan (10 June — 20 August 1920),
 Nikolai Kuzmin (20 August — 26 October 1920),
 Nikolai Lisovsky (26 October — 25 December 1920).

References 

Soviet field armies in the Russian Civil War
Military units and formations established in 1919
Military units and formations disestablished in 1920